Port Elizabeth was the name of a major city in the Eastern Cape province of South Africa. It was officially renamed Gqeberha on 23 February 2021. 

Port Elizabeth may also refer to:

 Port Elizabeth, Newfoundland and Labrador, Canada
 Port Elizabeth, New Jersey, USA
 Port Newark–Elizabeth Marine Terminal, New Jersey, USA
 Port Elizabeth, Saint Vincent and the Grenadines
 Port Elizabeth is a port or bay on the south side of Gilford Island, British Columbia